The V sets are a class of electric multiple units currently operated by NSW TrainLink. Built by Comeng between 1970 and 1989, the sets are of stainless steel construction, and are currently the oldest in the NSW TrainLink fleet. Initially introduced under the Public Transport Commission, only sets from 1977 and onwards remain in service, now operating on Interurban services throughout New South Wales on the Main Western line to Lithgow and Main Northern line to the Central Coast and Newcastle.

History

Orders and Contracts
The V sets were delivered over a 19-year period from 1970.

Series 1
NSWGR Contract 8/68 – Comeng contract 68/11 – specification 2384 – entered service 1970
 DCF8001 – DCF8008 (8)
 DDC9001 – DDC9004 (4)
 DTF9011 – DTF9012 (2)
 DTC9021 – DTC9022 (2)

Series 2
NSWGR Contract 2/76 – Comeng contract 76/3 – specification 2505 – entered service 1977
Oerlikon brake valves. Sigma Blue Light air conditioning. No crew air conditioning. Low dashboard. Coloured fault lights. Mesh Resistor covering on roof.
 DCM8021 – DCM8036 (16)
 DCT9031 – DCT9044 (14)

Series 3
NSWGR Contract 3/80 – Comeng contract 79/5 – specification 2505 – entered service 1982
Davies & Metcalf brake valves. Sigma Blue Light air conditioning. No crew air conditioning. Low dashboard. Coloured fault lights. Mesh resistor covering on roof.
 DIM8037 – DIM8052 (16)
 DIT9101 – DIT9114 (14)

NSWGR Contract 3/80E – Comeng contract 8007 – specification 2505
Davies & Metcalf brake valves. Sigma Blue Light air conditioning. No Crew air conditioning. Low dashboard. Coloured Fault Lights. Mesh Resistor covering on roof.
 DIM8053 – DIM8068 (16)

Series 4
NSWGR Contract 7/82 – Comeng contract 8205 – specification 2505 amended
Davies & Metcalf brake valves. Sigma Yellow Light air conditioning. Crew air conditioning installed. Low dashboard (High from DIM8090). Text fault lights. Mesh resistor covering on roof.
 DIM8069 – DIM8092 (24)
 DIT9115 – DIT9138 (24)

Series 5
A continuation of the contract for Series 4, these cars were fitted with Chopper controls.
NSWGR Contract 7/82 – Comeng Contract 8205 – Specification 2505 CH
Davies & Metcalf brake valves. Sigma Yellow Light air conditioning. Crew air conditioning installed. High dashboard. Text fault lights. Slatted covering on roof over Chopper equipment.
 DJM8093 – DJM8108 (16)
 DIT9139 – DIT9154 (16)

Series 6
NSWGR Contract 3/86 – Comeng contract 8601
Davies & Metcalf brake valves. Sigma Yellow Light air conditioning. Crew air conditioning installed. High dashboard. Text fault lights. Slatted covering on roof over Chopper equipment.
 DJM8109 – DJM8123 (15)
 DIT9155 – DIT9169 (15)

Series 7
NSWGR Contract 7/87 – Comeng contract 8701
Davies & Metcalf brake valves. Sigma Yellow Light air conditioning. Crew air conditioning installed. High dashboard. Text fault lights. Mesh covering on roof over Chopper equipment.
 DJM8124 – DJM8138 (15)
 DIT9170 – DIT9184 (15)

Series 8
The final series.
NSWGR Contract 1/88 – Comeng contract 8801
Davies & Metcalf brake valves. Yellow painted interior. Sigma Yellow Light air conditioning. Crew air conditioning installed. High dashboard. Text fault lights. Mesh covering on roof over Chopper equipment. Power operated vestibule doors (Now all isolated). Wide body side fluting, similar to that used by A Goninan & Co on their S sets. Spring Parking Brake in trailer car (Now all disconnected). Semi-permanently coupled 2 car blocks. These cars feature smoother body panels than the earlier cars.
 DKM8139 – DKM8145 (7)
 DKT9185 – DKT9191 (7)

First batch (DCF, DDC, DTF & DTC)
In July 1968, the Department of Railways New South Wales placed an order for the first batch 16 cars with Commonwealth Engineering. The first 4 cars debuted on the Sydney to Gosford route on 22 June 1970, targeted as F111. All 16 cars were in operation by September 1970.

These cars had many similar features to the later-built cars, including the one-piece moulded glass reinforced plastic end in royal blue & grey livery (earning them the Blue Goose nickname), semi-automatic doors, electronically controlled brakes and double-glazed windows. They had a different style of headlight and interior lighting to subsequent builds.

There were:
8 Power Cars – DCF 8001–8008 – Economy Class
4 Driving Trailer Cars – DDC 9001–9004 – 1st Class upper deck, Economy Class other seats
4 Trailer Cars – DTF 9011-9012 – Economy Class; DTC 9021–9022 – 1st Class upper deck, Economy Class other seats

The configuration of these cars was unsuccessful. The cars were fitted with AEI equipments, using similar traction motors to the 1955 electric single deck train stock (U sets and New South Wales Sputnik suburban carriage stock) but with a then brand new "Camshaft controller", for controlling power to the traction motors. The electrical equipments was split between the power and trailer car, the rotary voltage converter and the cables were not able to provide the power needed to operate the train as proposed. This resulted in many failures of the train to operate and also failures in the air-conditioning system.

One class travel was introduced in September 1974, so the seating was all economy class. This led to the refurbishment of the DDIU sets with the original luggage racks above the seating in the single deck section being removed. During this time the sets were targeted as U sets, the plates used on the single deck interurbans.

In the early 1980s, it was decided to convert these to trailer cars hence 16 power cars were ordered with no matching trailers. Between March and December 1982 the cars were rewired at Electric Carriage Workshops, and the driver compartments removed and replaced by passenger toilets and luggage space. The reinforced plastic ends remained, albeit with the blue removed.

The cars were subsequently renumbered:
DCF 8001–8008 > DMT 9201–9207 (7 cars remained after writing off DCF 8004)
DDC 9001–9004 > DDT 9208–9211
DTF 9011–9012 & DTC 9021–9022 > DFT 9212–9215
In 2005, these sets were withdrawn and scrapped following the discovery of rust in the steel frames.

Second batch (DCM & DCT) 
From October 1977, the second batch began to enter service, with many differences from the first batch. The electrical equipment was all mounted on the power car, using Mitsubishi Electric equipment; they had stainless steel underframes; were fitted with vacuum retention toilets, and had gold as opposed to green tinted windows. These cars were the first of the V sets, with the V showing that they were installed with vacuum retention toilets. They operated separately from the 1970 cars, as the two types were not compatible with each other.

The cars built were:

Power Cars – DCM 8021–8036
Driving Trailer Cars – DCT 9031–9044
The driving trailers were not used that much, due to driver complaints about an uncomfortable "kick" when the power car started to push the trailer. The controls in the DCTs were gradually stripped and used to replace defective controls in the DCMs. In 1990 DCT 9034 was refurbished by CityRail as a lounge car with lounge chairs and a kitchen for use as a charter car named Contura. It wasn't a success, not helped by poor marketing, and it was rebuilt as a conventional trailer (without controls) in 2000 and renumbered DET 9216. During the Citydecker refurbishment carried out by A Goninan & Co in the 1990s, DCT 9031-9036 had their driver controls reinstated and were recoded as DTDs allowing CityRail to introduce The River a two-car service from Wyong to St Marys. At the same time the DCMs were refurbished, receiving destination indicators and ditchlights. The refurbishment also saw the installation of air-conditioning in the driver's cabs of the DCMs, their lack of air-conditioning had a union ban preventing them being used as leading cars since 1995. DCM 8032–8036 were modified to have wheelchair seating, and recoded as DTMs. The DCMs that had destination indicators eventually had them removed and replaced with a metal blanking plate, after a decision not to use them on Interurban services. Some were withdrawn in 2011, and were scrapped in November-October 2021.

Third batch (DIM & DIT) 
From May 1981, DIM Power Cars and DIT trailers started to be delivered. These cars had increased seating compared with the DC series, up from 88 to 96 for the power cars, and from 92 to 112 for the trailers.

The cars built were:

Power Cars – DIM 8037–8092
Trailer Cars – DIT 9101–9184

DIM 8037-8068 and were the last cars to be delivered with the Blue Goose moulded fibreglass ends, cream & wood veneer interiors and green seats.

DIM 8069-8092 were built with a white moulded fibreglass end incorporating the State Rail Authority's corporate colours of red, orange and yellow, yellow interiors, newer air conditioning technology and ditchlights. These can be distinguished from the earlier DIMs by the air-conditioning grille cover.

DJM and the rest of DIT cars 

Technological advances saw a thyristor chopper system fitted to the next batch of power cars, coded DJM. The chopper cars gave a smoother and quieter ride. The chopper cars can be distinguished from the earlier camshaft cars by a large open grille at the pantograph end of the power car, and by different hatch coverings over the driver's side of the power car. DJM 8123–8137 had even larger open grilles on the pantograph end. DJM 8101 had its Candy livery moulded fibreglass end repainted into CityRail blue and yellow in 1990 to form a special set, with the commemorative wording "celebrating 20 years of double-deck intercity services to Gosford" applied near the driver's cab window. In 2009, DJM 8101's front was repainted into standard Intercity livery.

Final batch (DKM & DKT) 

The final V sets were introduced in 1989, and they were the last carriages to be built by Comeng's Granville factory. These cars were coded DKM and DKT and are permanently coupled. There were several changes: the cars were finished in corrugated steel, instead of the previous inserted Budd fluting. Seating had separate seat backs. Instead of the push-pull doors inside the previous V sets, the DKs were fitted with an electronically operated vestibule door, and no door was installed at the gangway. The State Rail Authority wanted to order an extra 50 but funding was not available.

Overhauls

During 1993, the distinctive gold tinted windows were replaced by charcoal ones. Starting in May 1995 the earlier carriages were overhauled by A Goninan & Co, Broadmeadow as part of the CityDecker program. This saw the DCMs receive driver's cab air conditioning, destination indicators and ditchlights where not already fitted. The fibreglass end was repainted grey and yellow. This was later changed to blue and yellow.

Eventually all cars were put through the program with those with yellow interiors being refurbished in the same cream interior with green seats style as the older cars.

On 1 July 2013, a refurbishment of the remaining 200 cars was announced as part of the NSW TrainLink and Sydney Trains restructure and branding. The refurbishment most notably included new carpets and seat covers themed in 'Bush Plum'. The external livery of the trains are also changed to a grey, red and yellow scheme.

In service
When introduced, the V sets operated interurban services from Sydney Central on the Main Northern line to Gosford and on the Main Western line to Mount Victoria. It wasn't until the Ten Tunnels west of Clarence were lowered in 1978 that they were able to operate to Lithgow.

Following the extension of the electrified network, their sphere of operation was extended to Wyong (April 1982), Newcastle (June 1984), Port Kembla (February 1986), Dapto (January 1993) and Kiama (November 2001). From January 2012, V sets ceased operating South Coast services. In June 2015, retired cars 8038-9031-9040-8040 were returned to service as V27.

Accidents

DCF 8004 – on 16 January 1976, a six-car set broke down at Glenbrook, when locomotive 4623 struck the rear car killing one passenger and injuring several others. The damaged rear motor car was moved to the side of the track to clear the line, but it overbalanced and fell down a 400m deep gorge, breaking in half on the way down. The pieces were lifted out with RAAF helicopters.
DCM 8030 was written off after an accident near Emu Plains in September 1985
DIM 8048 was written off after an accident at Springwood in September 1987
DJM 8107 was written off after an incident at Lawson in November 1989
DIM 8037 was written off after an accident at Katoomba in January 1990
DIM 8060 was written off after the Cowan rail accident in May 1990
DIM 8067 on 2 December 1999 collided with the rear car carrier of the Indian Pacific in the Glenbrook train disaster rebuilt as DIM 8020
DCM 8027 was rebuilt after an accident at Katoomba after a tree fell onto the roof in mid 2011
DCM 8028 was written off after being crushed by falling trees at Medlow Bath in July 2011
V40 and V48 collided with each other at Mount Victoria in July 2015. Two cars of V40 (DKM 8144, DKT 9190) and V48 (DJM 8113, DIT 9147) were withdrawn for repairs and have since returned to service, since mid-2017 the cars have been reverted to usual.

Withdrawal
The remaining 15 original series cars were withdrawn in late 2005 due to corrosion in the underframes, these cars had mild steel underframes and stainless steel bodies and the contact between these 2 dissimilar metals resulted in galvanic corrosion. DMT 9204 was subsequently destroyed in an emergency services training exercise on 25 November 2008.

In January 2011, an additional 25 Oscar H set cars were ordered to replace the 1977 batch of V sets. However some remain in service and were put through the refurbishment programme in 2014.

All are to be replaced by D sets with passenger services expected to begin in December 2022.

Y sets
Six cars from the third batch were converted into test trains to test/trial the Automatic Train Protection (ATP) system and the Digital Train Radio System (DTRS) across the electrified network. DJMs 8121, 8127, 8128 & 8134 and DITs 9127 & 9131 were formed into two sets numbered Y1 and Y2. They were fitted with computers and test equipment, several CCTV cameras and small kitchens in the trailer cars. These sets were formed into two 3 car sets which when combined make up a 6 car consist.

References

Further reading

External links
 
 Technical diagrams and specifications Transport for NSW

Double-decker EMUs
Electric multiple units of New South Wales
NSW TrainLink
Train-related introductions in 1970
1500 V DC multiple units of New South Wales